AC Connecticut is an American amateur soccer team based in Newtown, Connecticut, playing in USL League Two, the fourth tier of the American soccer pyramid. The team colors are blue, black and white.

History

CFC Azul was founded as a USL PDL team on December 21, 2011, and launched its inaugural season in 2012. The club is the pinnacle for a 70-plus youth team organization and is Connecticut's only professional organized soccer franchise. In its first season of play, CFC Azul finished mid-table tied for 4th place with fellow expansion team Worcester Hydra.

In 2013, CFC finished in 6th place with a record of 2 wins, 6 losses and 6 draws. In time for the start of the 2014 season, Peter D'Amico became the primary owner and managing partner of the Azul. Additionally, CFC teamed up with WXCI 91.7 FM to broadcast play-by-play of Azul's home games.

The team split off from its Connecticut Football Club (CFC) parent and was renamed AC Connecticut on September 5, 2014.

In 2021, AC Connecticut announced a partnership with Hartford Athletic to identify potential players and create a pathway to pro soccer.

Stadium
The team was originally scheduled to play their home games at Reese Stadium on the campus of Yale University. However, due to scheduling conflicts, CFC Azul ended playing their 2012 home games at various locations throughout Connecticut including Veterans Stadium in New Britain, CT. For the 2013 season, CFC Azul played their home games at Central Connecticut State University. CFC Azul signed a muti-year contract to play their games the Westside Athletic Complex at Western Connecticut State University. AC Connecticut now plays their home games at Dillion Stadium in Hartford, CT the home of the USL Championship team, the Hartford Athletic. They also have facilities in Newtown, CT at North Yarmouth Academy Sports & Fitness.

Year-by-year

Players and staff

Notable former players
  Steve Covino
  Ryan Kinne
  Jannik Eckenrode
  Gianluca Catalano
  Henry Kessler

Current staff

  Robin Schuppert – General Manager
  Alex Harrison – Head Coach
  Joe Mingachos – Head Coach
  Joe Falstoe – Assistant Coach
  Sean Weir – Fitness Coach
  Paul Winstanley – Goalie Coach

See also
 Hartford Athletic

References

External links
 

Soccer clubs in Connecticut
Sports in New Haven, Connecticut
2011 establishments in Connecticut
USL League Two teams